Toca da Boa Vista (BA-082) is the longest known cave in the Southern hemisphere. It is located within the municipality of Campo Formoso, 11 km east of the town of Lage dos Negros, in the State of Bahia, Brazil.  it had over 120 km of mapped passages, which makes it the 13th longest cave in the world. Continued exploration faces typical temperatures of up to 30 Cº.

Toca da Boa Vista is within 2 km of another significant cave named Toca da Barriguda, 23 km long, which is Brazil's second longest. It is the largest cave in the world generated by the process of dissolution of dolomite, mainly through the oxidation of sulfides.

See also
List of caves in Brazil
List of longest caves

References

Sources
 Auler, A.S. & Smart, P.L. 1999. Toca da Boa Vista, Bahia state – the longest known cave in the Southern Hemisphere in: Schobbenhaus, C.; Campos, D.A.; Queiroz, E.T.; Winge, M.; Berbert-Born, M. (Edit.) Sítios Geológicos e Paleontológicos do Brasil. (Online)

External links
 Base de Dados do Ministerio do Meio Ambiente Governo Federal – ICMBIO Official Website

Limestone caves
Wild caves
Caves of Bahia